Umbilicaria polyphylla, commonly known as petaled rock tripe, is a widely distributed species of saxicolous lichen in the family Umbilicariaceae. It was first described by Carl Linnaeus in his 1753 work Species Plantarum as Lichen polyphyllus. German botanist Johann Christian Gottlob Baumgarten transferred it to the genus Umbilicaria in 1790. The lichen has a dark brown to black thallus that measures  in diameter. The upper surface is smooth, while the lower surface is sooty black. It grows on exposed rocks, typically in arctic-alpine habitats.

In Iceland, it has the conservation status of a vulnerable species (VU).

References

polyphylla
Lichen species
Taxa named by Carl Linnaeus
Lichens described in 1753
Lichens of Europe
Lichens of North America
Lichens of the Arctic